Berry Bees is an animated television series developed for the Nine Network that premiered on 9Go! in Australia on 5 October 2019. The series is based on the Italian book series of the same name by Cat Le Blanc. The series is produced by Atlantyca Entertainment, SLR Productions, Telegael, and Cosmos-Maya Production.
The entire series is available to stream on Stan.

The show centers around three young girls who carry out spy missions.

Plot 
Bobby, Lola, and Juliette are three extraordinary 10-year-old girls who live a seemingly normal life. However the trio work undercover as the "Berry Bees" for the Bee Intelligence Agency (B.I.A. for short), a secret agency that selected them to carry out special spy missions. The girls, all codenamed after a type of berry, are given gadgets each episode by the head of the agency, Ms. Berry.

Usually the girls have to foil the evil plans of recurring villains such as Tara Bytes, Mirage, and the Greenthumbs. At the end of each episode, the villain escapes the confusion to fight the girls another day while things return to normal.

Characters

Main 
 Bobby – An expert in technology and a nerd. Her codename is Raspberry.
 Lola – A skilled contortionist and acrobat. Her codename is Strawberry.
 Juliette – A talented actress and mentalist. Her codename is Blueberry.
 Ms. Berry – The head of the B.I.A.

Villains 
 Tara Bytes – A corrupt tech mogul. Her plots usually focus on advanced technology.
 Aaron Mirage – A thief who can assume the identity of anyone.
 Cosmo and Fauna Greenthumb – A bickering old couple who wish to make the environment better for animals.

Production 
On 16 October 2018, it was announced that an animated series based on the Berry Bees book series was being produced. The series is produced by Atlantyca Entertainment in Italy, SLR Productions in Australia, Telegael in Ireland, and Cosmos-Maya Production in India.

The show's visual team found their inspiration in Mission Impossible and James Bond movies. The director, Niccolò Sacchi also singled out The Incredibles for its character and action scenes. He looked at Kim Possible all the time, "because of the show’s fantastic direction and staging of the shots." The team's reference for design was Rapunzel's Tangled Adventure. "[He] wanted to have the same feel for the characters with no outline and where shadows were used to give depth to the characters' skin and expressions."

Episodes
The first season consists of 52 11-minute episodes.

Broadcast 
Berry Bees first premiered on 9Go! in Australia on 5 October 2019. By the 7th episode, premieres suddenly moved from Saturdays to Sundays starting 27 October. In Italy, the series premiered on Rai Gulp on December 16 with episodes 2 and 10. Since two segments are combined into one in the Australian broadcast of the series, the cold open in every second episode that airs is cut, but is retained in the Italian broadcast due to the segments being separately aired.

Awards 
On 12 July 2019, the episode "Hypnotic Hair Don't Care" was nominated in the 52nd Annual AWGIE Awards in the "Animation" category, with writer Joel Slack-Smith as a recipient, before the series premiered in Australia. It lost to an episode of Beat Bugs.

References

External links 
 
  on RaiPlay
  on Stan

2010s Australian animated television series
2020s Australian animated television series
2019 Australian television series debuts
2019 Irish television series debuts
2019 Italian television series debuts
2019 Indian television series debuts
Australian children's animated action television series
Australian children's animated adventure television series
Australian children's animated comedy television series
Italian children's animated action television series
Italian children's animated adventure television series
Italian children's animated comedy television series
Australian flash animated television series
English-language television shows
Australian television shows based on children's books
Singaporean animated television series
Espionage television series
Animated television series about children
Fiction about memory erasure and alteration
Fictional trios